The Hildegardis-Schule is a secondary school in the city of Bochum, Germany.

History 
The school was founded in 1860 by a young Bochum teacher, Henriette von Noël, as a private school for girls. An extension was built in 1901 and in 1916, the school was named after naturalist, theologian and author, Hildegard von Bingen. There is a statue of Hildegard von Bingen in front of the main entrance.

Today, the school is a public Gymnasium for boys and girls. The Hildegardis-Schule was one of the first schools in Germany to offer French bilingual education. History, politics and geography are taught in French and students may graduate with a French baccalaureat as well as an Abitur. In 2008, the school was certified as a "Europaschule" (de) by the Ministry of Schools of North Rhine-Westphalia.

Student exchange program 
The Hildegardis-Schule has a student exchange program with schools in
 Wolverhampton in England
 Lyon, Duttlenheim, Châlons-en-Champagne, Châteauneuf-sur-Sarthe, Ile de la Réunion in France
 Vicenza in Italy
 Piekary Śląskie in Poland
 Be'er Sheva in Israel

Notes

References

External links
 Hildegardis-Schule Bochum Official school website
 School profile

Schools in North Rhine-Westphalia
Educational institutions established in 1860
Hildegard of Bingen
1860 establishments in Germany